Rodolphia is a genus of moths in the family Sesiidae containing only one species, Rodolphia hombergi, which is known from Madagascar.

References

Sesiidae
Moths of Madagascar
Moths of Africa
Moths described in 1911